The Invisible Band is the third studio album by Scottish rock band Travis. It was first released on 11 June 2001 in the United Kingdom by Independiente and a day later in the United States by Epic Records. The title of the album makes reference to the band's feelings regarding music being more important than the band making it. Band frontman Fran Healy stated in an interview that the album's title referred to the band's status of having famous songs, but not being famous themselves. The album spent four weeks at the top of the UK Albums Chart, selling more copies in that time than their previous album, The Man Who, managed in half a year.

The Invisible Band was another strong seller from the band following their previous album, The Man Who, eventually becoming with 97th best-selling album of the 2000s decade in the United Kingdom.

Critical reception

The Invisible Band received positive reviews from music critics. At Metacritic, which assigns a normalised rating out of 100 to reviews from mainstream critics, the album received an average score of 71 based on 17 reviews, which indicates "generally favorable reviews".

Q magazine said of the album, "While the wheel remains un-reinvented, The Invisible Band finds its mark with unerring accuracy". While Launch also said of the album, "Songs like the stirring "Side", the delicate "Dear Diary", and the glistening "Follow The Light" are among the best and most fully crafted of Fran Healy's short but accomplished writing career". Q also listed it as one of the best 50 albums of 2001.

Leonard's Lair fully reviewed the album, claiming that, "Along with Coldplay's 'Parachutes', 'The Man Who' slowly became one of the ubiquitous releases at the turn of the century. Yet although the likes of 'Turn' and 'Driftwood' were undeniably easy on the ear paradigms for thoughtful indie/adult rock, they seemed to lack any kind of edge to go further particularly on the unremarkable 'Why Does It Always Rain On Me?' which was in danger of becoming their musical albatross. It seems as they have never been away but the follow-up release signifies their intention to become known as an albums band. The singles thus far, 'Sing' and 'Side', both feature hypnotic tunes courtesy mainly of Andy Dunlop's fine guitar work; the former is hopeful and joyous whilst the latter is steeped in melancholy. Further exposure to the album unveils a remarkably consistent level of songwriting with the unassuming-looking Dunlop always able to turn guitar and even banjo into memorable verses and choruses whilst Fran Healy sensibly never over-reaches in his successful quest for the yearning vocal. It's easy to imagine that the earnest, yet brilliant, likes of 'The Last Train' and 'Pipe Dreams' might alienate former fans but Travis are clearly above turning into victims of their own success. As an exercise in how modern rock should sound like, 'The Invisible Band' will take some beating".

Usage in media
The song "Follow the Light" is featured in the 2002 movie Crossroads. "Flowers in the Window" is featured in the 2004 film Saved!, second-season episode of Merseybeat (2002), and as background music during a scene of the 2002 Only Fools and Horses Christmas Special "Strangers on the Shore". The song "Sing" is featured in the 2002 film Mr. Deeds and in the 2003 Only Fools and Horses Christmas Special "Sleepless in Peckham". It also makes a brief appearance on NBC's The Office in the second-season episode "The Client", and is heard again in the season six episode "The Banker". "Side" can be heard briefly in The Offices second-season episode titled "Email Surveillance". "Humpty Dumpty Love Song" was featured in the second episode of TNT's series Heartland (2007).

Track listing

Personnel
Adapted from the album liner notes.Travis Fran Healy – vocals, guitar, piano
 Andy Dunlop – guitar, banjo
 Dougie Payne – bass guitar
 Neil Primrose – drumsAdditional musicians Jason Falkner – keyboards (track 9)
 Millennia Strings – strings (tracks 1, 11 and 12)
 Joby Talbot – string arrangement (tracks 1, 11 and 12)Additional personnel'
 Nigel Godrich – production, mixing
 Bernie Grundman Mastering – mastering
Darrel Thorp – assistant engineer at Ocean Way Studios
 Jon Bailey – assistant engineer at Air Studios
 Steve Orchard – string engineering (tracks 11 and 12)

Charts

Weekly charts

Year-end charts

Certifications

References

2001 albums
Travis (band) albums
Epic Records albums
Independiente Records albums
Albums produced by Nigel Godrich